Cannabinoid hyperemesis syndrome (CHS) is recurrent nausea, vomiting, and cramping abdominal pain that can occur due to prolonged, high-dose cannabis use. These symptoms may be relieved temporarily by taking a hot shower or bath. Complications may include kidney failure and electrolyte problems, and the condition can be fatal if not properly managed.

Weekly cannabis use is generally required for the syndrome to occur; synthetic cannabinoids can also cause CHS. The underlying mechanism is unclear, with several possibilities proposed. Diagnosis is based on the symptoms, as well as the history of cannabis use (including a urine screen test if necessary). The condition is typically present for some time before the diagnosis is made. Another condition that presents similarly is cyclic vomiting syndrome (CVS).

The only known effective treatment for CHS is to stop using cannabis. Two weeks (or possibly more) may be required to see a benefit. The primary differentiation between CHS and CVS is that cessation of cannabis use only relieves CHS.

Treatments during an episode of vomiting are generally supportive in nature (e.g., hydration). There is tentative evidence for the use of capsaicin cream on the abdomen during an acute episode.

The syndrome was first described in 2004, and simplified diagnostic criteria were published in 2009.

Signs and symptoms
The long-term and short-term effects of cannabis use are associated with behavioral effects leading to a wide variety of effects on the body systems and physiological states. CHS is a paradoxical syndrome characterized by hyperemesis (persistent vomiting), as opposed to the better known antiemetic properties of cannabinoids. Specifically, CHS takes the pattern of cyclical nausea, vomiting, and abdominal pain in the setting of chronic cannabinoid use. The abdominal pain tends to be mild and diffused. There are three phases of CHS: the prodromal phase, the hyperemetic phase, and the recovery phase.

Prodromal phase
The prodromal phase is characterized by mild symptoms of CHS, including nausea, anxiety, mild discomfort, sweating, and increased thirst; symptoms are more severe in the morning. Prior to the use of compensatory exposure to hot water to treat symptoms, people sometimes increase their intake of cannabinoids in an effort to treat the persistent nausea they experience. This phase can last for months or even years.

Hyperemetic phase
The hyperemetic phase is characterized by the full syndromal symptoms of CHS, including persistent nausea, vomiting, abdominal pain, and retching. Retching can occur up to five times per hour. Acute episodes of cannabinoid hyperemesis typically last for 24–48 hours. The symptoms experienced in this phase are cyclical, and can recur unpredictably in intervals of weeks to months. It is very difficult to take food or medicine by mouth during this stage, and patients may develop a fear of eating. Weight loss and dehydration due to decreased oral intake and vomiting are possible. It is during this hyperemetic phase that people with CHS are likely to present to the emergency department of the hospital for treatment.

Treatment via hot water, sometimes for hours at a time, relieves symptoms for many patients, which can result in compulsive bathing or showering. People have described the hot water relief as "temperature-dependent," meaning that hotter temperatures provide greater relief.

Recovery phase
The recovery phase begins after the patient abstains from cannabis consumption, but the time for resolution of symptoms is unclear: it has been reported to occur within two weeks, or to take one to three months.
Lost weight can be regained due to a restoration of normal oral intake, and compulsive bathing/showering can give way to normal patterns of behavior. If a person in this phase consumes cannabis again, their symptoms tend to come back. Relapses are common due to reinitiation of cannabis consumption, following which many people use or increase their use of cannabis due to concerns about nausea. Increased patient education may be necessary.

Complications
Two deaths were reported as complications of associated kidney failure and electrolyte disorders.

Pathogenesis
Cannabis contains more than 400 different chemicals, of which about 60 are cannabinoids. The chemical composition of cannabis may vary between cannabis products, making it difficult to identify the specific chemical(s) responsible for the syndrome. The pathophysiology of CHS is complicated by the complex action of these chemicals throughout the body, both in the central nervous system and in the gastrointestinal system. Cannabis-related factors, such as the amount of THC in the cannabis, the amount of use, and the duration of use likely play a role, but are not yet well understood. Other factors, such as chronic stress, genetics, and emotional factors, may influence the risk for CHS.

Various pathogenic mechanistic theories attempting to explain symptoms have been put forward:
dose-dependent buildup of cannabinoids and related effects of cannabinoid toxicity
the functionality of cannabinoid receptors in the brain and particularly in the hypothalamus (which regulates body temperature and the digestive system)
direct stimulation of cannabinoid receptors in the digestive system.
It has been hypothesized that certain people may be genetically pre-disposed to metabolize cannabinoids in an atypical manner, making them susceptible to CHS.

Another cannabinoid called cannabigerol acts as an antagonist at cannabinoid (CB1) and serotonin (5HT1A) receptors, antagonizing the anti-emetic effects of cannabidiol that occurs through its effects on serotonin.

Cannabinoid buildup theory
Tetrahydrocannabinol (THC) is a fat-soluble cannabinoid that can be deposited into a person's fat stores, accounting for the long elimination half-life of THC. During periods of stress or food deprivation, a person's fat stores can be mobilized (lipolysis) for energy consumption, releasing the previously stored THC back into the blood. The mechanism can be characterized as a "reintoxication effect."

Diagnosis 
The diagnostic criteria for CHS were ill-defined prior to the establishment of the Rome IV criteria of 2016. The criteria specify symptoms which resemble cyclic vomiting syndrome and which occur after long-term cannabis use, but which cease after cannabis use is halted. 

Various diagnostic frameworks for CHS have been proposed. , the modified criteria by Simonetto et al. are the most frequently used. The most important feature is detecting a history of cannabinoid use, the denial of which can delay proper diagnosis. A urine drug screen can be useful for objectively determining the presence of cannabinoids in a person's system. Cannabinoid metabolites (specifically 11-nor-Δ9-carboxylic acid) can be detected in urine for about 2 to 8 days with short-term use, and for 14–42 days of chronic use.

Other commonly used diagnostic tests include laboratory blood tests (complete blood count and differential, blood glucose, basic metabolic panel, pancreatic and liver enzymes), pregnancy test, urinalysis, and plain flat radiographic series.  These are used to rule out unrelated conditions, such as pregnancy or infection.

Prior to diagnosing and treating for a presumed CHS, more serious medical conditions need to be ruled out. Medical conditions that may present similarly to CHS include cyclic vomiting syndrome, bowel perforation or obstruction, gastroparesis, cholangitis, pancreatitis, nephrolithiasis, cholecystitis, diverticulitis, ectopic pregnancy, pelvic inflammatory disease, heart attack, acute hepatitis, adrenal insufficiency, and ruptured aortic aneurysm. In general, CHS is most often misdiagnosed as cyclic vomiting syndrome. However, if simple laboratory tests and imaging have excluded more serious conditions, it is reasonable to monitor for a worsening of the patient's status to prevent the unnecessary application of more invasive, and potentially dangerous, diagnostic procedures (e.g., exploratory surgery). 

A complete history of the person's use of cannabinoids is important in establishing the correct diagnosis.  CHS has often been undiagnosed, even for years. This may be due to reluctance on behalf of patients to fully disclose their use of cannabis to healthcare professionals, especially when another person is accompanying the patient to an appointment or emergency department visit. Identifying the correct diagnosis saves money for the healthcare system and reduces morbidity associated with the condition.

Treatment
Many traditional medications for nausea and vomiting are ineffective. Treatment is otherwise supportive and focuses on stopping cannabis use. Proper patient education includes informing patients that their symptoms are due to their use of cannabis/cannabinoids, and that exposure to cannabinoids in the future are likely to cause their symptoms to return. Clinical pharmacists can play a role in administering this education, as well as encouraging patients to seek the assistance of mental health providers. Abstinence from cannabinoids currently remains the only definitive treatment. Cognitive behavioral therapy and motivational enhancement therapy are evidence-based outpatient treatment options for patients with cannabis use disorder.

Symptomatic relief is noted with exposure to hot water (greater than 41°C, 106°F), which is mediated by TRPV–the capsaicin receptor. Assessing for dehydration due to vomiting and hot showers is important as it can lead to acute kidney failure, and this is easily treated with IV fluids. If dehydration is severe, hospitalization may be required. Based on the mechanism of the effect, some clinicians have used topical capsaicin cream applied to the periumbilical area in the treatment of acute CHS. The use of capsaicin as first-line treatment for CHS has been well tolerated, though the evidence for efficacy is limited. The use of hot water showers in the emergency department setting has been advocated in situations where topical capsaicin cream is unavailable, though the same precautions to hot water use (dehydration, burn injury) are required.

The use of antipsychotics, such as haloperidol and olanzapine, have provided complete relief of symptoms in case-reports. The evidence for the use of benzodiazepines, such as lorazepam, has shown mixed results. Other drug treatments that have been tried, with unclear efficacy, include neurokinin-1 receptor antagonists, first-generation antihistamines (e.g. diphenhydramine), 5-HT3 receptor antagonists (e.g. ondansetron), and non-antipsychotic antidopaminergics (e.g. metoclopramide).

Acetaminophen has shown some benefit in case reports for alleviating headaches associated with CHS. Opioids can provide some relief of abdominal pain, but their use is discouraged due to the risk of worsening nausea and vomiting.

Epidemiology
 a French pharmacovigilance program for drug users had received reports of 29 cases of CHS. At the time there were 113 case described in the international medical literature. CHS incidence is likely to have been substantially under-reported.  A retrospective application of the 2016 Rome IV criteria to cases recorded in prior literature suggested that the number of people with CHS had been over-estimated.

In the United States, an analysis of data from the National Emergency Department Sample between 2006 and 2013 found an increase in emergency room attendees with vomiting who also had cannabis use disorder, to a rate of approximately 13 per 100,000 attendees. It is possible this rise, of around  times, may be affected by sampling bias, as initial awareness of CHS prompted more diligent questioning and recording of when such ER attendees were also cannabis users.

The number of people affected was unclear as of 2015. CHS has been reported more frequently in people that use cannabis daily (47.9% of people with CHS) and greater than daily (23.7% of people with CHS), compared to once weekly users (19.4% of people with CHS) and less frequent users (2.4% of people with CHS). A significant increase in the incidence of CHS (and other cannabis-related visits to the emergency department) has been noted in U.S. states that have legalized cannabis, with the incidence of cyclic vomiting prominently doubling in the US state of Colorado after legalization. As the use of cannabis continues to be legalized at the state level, the prevalence of CHS is expected to increase in the US.

History
Cannabinoid hyperemesis was first reported in the Adelaide Hills of South Australia in 2004.

The name "cannabinoid hyperemesis syndrome" was also coined at this time. The report focused on nine patients who were chronic cannabis users who presented with cyclical vomiting illness. One woman in the study reported that warm baths provided the only relief from the nausea, severe vomiting, and stomach pain, and reportedly burned herself in a hot water bath three times trying to get relief.

Society and culture
CHS is not very well known. In lieu of a correct diagnosis, the average patient in the US may be charged $100,000 or more in medical bills through emergency department visits. An emergency department physician in 2018 commented that the condition wasn't on their "radar" in the five years prior, though the condition was being diagnosed more often now. Many people are surprised by the notion that cannabis can induce symptoms of nausea and vomiting, given the fact that cannabis is used to prevent nausea and vomiting. 

The portmanteau "scromiting" (scream + vomiting) has been used as a colloquial name for the condition, though it is not clear how widespread the use of the term is.

Research directions
It is unclear why CHS is disproportionately uncommon in recognition of how widely used cannabis is throughout the world. There may be genetic differences between cannabis users that affect one's risk for developing CHS, e.g., a genetic difference affecting cannabinoid metabolism that increases the level of pro-emetic cannabinoids. The pathophysiology of the syndrome is also unclear, especially with regards to the effect of cannabinoids on the gut. The long-term outcomes of patients that have had CHS are unknown.

References

Further reading

External links 

Cannabis and health
Vomiting
Syndromes
Substance intoxication